Hanna Katariina Mäntylä (born 19 September 1974) is a Finnish politician and the former Minister of Social Affairs and Health. She represented the Finns Party until June 2017 and was the second deputy chairwoman of the party. She was elected to the Parliament from Lapland in 2011. She maintained her seat in the 2015 parliamentary election. She was appointed Minister of Social Affairs and Health in May 2015.

On 16 August 2016, Mäntylä announced that she would leave her minister duties due to personal reasons and will continue as a Member of Parliament.

On 13 June 2017, Mäntylä and 19 others left the Finns Party parliamentary group to found the New Alternative parliamentary group. On 21 June 2017, Mäntylä announced that she will leave the Parliament to work for the Council of Europe.

By profession, Mäntylä is a youth worker, and she has studied social work in the University of Lapland. Before her parliamentary career she was an entrepreneur, and operated a lingerie retail outlet.

References

External links

 Parliament of Finland: Hanna Mäntylä 
 Home page 

1974 births
Living people
People from Lahti
Finns Party politicians
Blue Reform politicians
Ministers of Social Affairs of Finland
Members of the Parliament of Finland (2011–15)
Members of the Parliament of Finland (2015–19)
Women government ministers of Finland
21st-century Finnish women politicians
Women members of the Parliament of Finland